Frank Jahmier Childress (born July 6, 1998), known professionally as Comethazine, is an American rapper and songwriter. He is best known for his platinum-selling single "Walk", which peaked at number 20 on the Billboard Bubbling Under Hot 100 chart and "Bands". Both songs were included on his debut mixtape, Bawskee (2018).

Bawskee was followed up by four sequels; Bawskee 2, Bawskee 3.5, Bawskee 4, and Bawskee 5. His debut album, Pandemic, was released in early 2020 to mainly positive critical reception. In 2019, he was an XXL Freshman and performed his cypher alongside rappers Roddy Ricch and Tierra Whack. His latest album Bawskee 5 was released in November 2022.

Career
Comethazine began posting his music on audio distribution platform SoundCloud and video distribution platform Spotify as a teenager, allowing him to quit his job as a mechanic to focus on music full-time.

In early 2018, a feature on SoundCloud that allows their original sound file to be switched was abused for an unofficial upload of rapper YBN Nahmir's song "Bounce Out with That", that was replaced with his song "Bands", causing it to acquire the chart data of "Bounce Out with That". It is unclear who perpetrated this, though the account associated with the switch has since been removed. This incident helped increase the popularity of "Bands", which later appeared on his debut mixtape Bawskee. Another song on the mixtape, "Walk", became a viral hit and propelled Comethazine to further recognition. In 2019, he was selected to be a part of the 2019 XXL Freshmen Class. Comethazine announced the creation of his own record label, Hench Mafia Records, in June 2019.

On March 27, 2020, Comethazine's debut studio album, Pandemic, was released. His next project, Bawskee 4 followed on October 23, 2020, preceded by the music videos for "We Gone Win", "Air Max", and "Derek Jeter". Comethazine shot another music video for the song, "556", and released the entire album alongside it.

In late December 2020, Comethazine announced that his upcoming album would be titled Comethazine the Album. He directed and shot a television show called Doogie. It will premiere on Amazon Prime Video on a date that is TBD.

On October 22, 2021, Comethazine the Album was released. It was promoted with the singles "Spinback" and "Six Flags".

On November 17, 2022, Bawskee 5 was released. Comethazine previewed the tracklist in a tweet posted the day prior.

Musical style and influences
Comethazine's music has been compared as a mixture of Playboi Carti, Smokepurpp and Tay-K, and has been referred to as anti-melody, a derivative form of trap that uses the bass as a source of melody instead of traditional instrumentation. He has cited rappers such as Big Mike, Pimp C, Chingy, Jadakiss, Special Ed, Chief Keef, Playboi Carti, Eminem, Waka Flocka Flame, 50 Cent, and Jim Jones as musical influences.

Discography

Albums

Mixtapes

Singles

Other charted songs

References

1998 births
Living people
21st-century American rappers
21st-century American male musicians
African-American male rappers
People from East St. Louis, Illinois
Rappers from Illinois
Midwest hip hop musicians
Gangsta rappers
Sony Music artists
Trap musicians
Drill musicians
Songwriters from Illinois